Mohamed Sorel Camara (born 27 May 1997) is a Guinean footballer who currently plays as a midfielder for French side FCO Tourangeau.

Career statistics

Club

Notes

International

International goals
Scores and results list Guinea's goal tally first, score column indicates score after each Guinea goal.

References

1997 births
Living people
Guinean footballers
Guinea international footballers
Association football midfielders
Championnat National 3 players
Fello Star players
Hafia FC players
AS Kaloum Star players
Tours FC players
Guinean expatriate footballers
Guinean expatriate sportspeople in France
Expatriate footballers in France
People from Kindia